Solenopleuridae is a family of trilobites, containing the following genera:

Abakanopleura
Acanthometopus
Acrocephalaspis
Aiaiaspis
Aidarella
Aikhaliella
Albansia
Aldanaspis
Badulesia
Bigranulella
Bijelina
Braintreella
Canotaspis
Catasolenopleura
Changqingia
Colliceps
Conicephalus
Crusoia
Daldynaspis
Datongites
Denaspis
Eilura
Ejinaspis
Erratojincella
Foveatella
Gonzaloia
Gushanaspis
Herse
Huzhuia
Hyperoparia
Jiagouia
Jincella
Kabuqiia
Kaipingella
Karagandoides
Keguqinia
Lashushania
Levisia
Lingyuanaspis
Liosolenopleura
Maiaspis
Manublesia
Markhaspis
Mataninella
Menocephalites
Minupeltis
Mukrania
Munija
Neoacrocephalites
Neosolenopleurella
Nilegna
Ninaspis
Notocoryphe
Paracrocephalites
Paramenocephalites
Parasolenoparia
Parasolopleurena
Parayabeia
Pardailhania
Perneraspis
Pingluia
Plesisolenoparia
Proavus
Protrachoparia
Pseudosolenoparia
Reillopleura
Rimouskia
Rina
Sao
Shanghaiaspis
Sohopleura
Solenoparia
Solenoparops
Solenopleura
Solenopleurella
Solenopleuropsis
Squarrosoella
Suyougouia
Tabalqueia
Tangwangzhaia
Tjungiella
Trachoparia
Usumunaspis
Velieuxia
Wafangdiania
Xianfengia
Yabeia

References

 
Ptychoparioidea
Trilobite families